The Imam Hussein Mosque is a mosque in Baku, Azerbaijan which was built in 1896 by Adolf Eichler's design. The mosque is located at the intersection of Abdullah Shaig and Suleiman Tagizade streets.

History
The initiator of mosque building was Haji Baba Ashumov. Mosque was built in Chemberkend block, on amphitheater heights.

In 1895 Ashumov hired the architect Adolf Eichler to design the building and mosque building was completed in 1896.

Folk named it as “Ashumov’s mosque”. Imam Hussein mosque is “A monument of history and culture of local importance” according to Azerbaijan's Cabinet of Minister's decree.

Architecture
Mosque was designed in local architecture style. Interior of the mosque consists of a prayer hall, lobby, two rows, and a dome. The decorated mihrab is located at the end of hall. Windows were included in tholobate (or drum) of the dome, so believers could see the “Sacred light of being”.

Architectural weight also highlights of volume and dimensions of the structure. Facade in the west consists of the number of pylons and decorated with perlon (nylon 6).

The entrance was decorated with stalactites and is complementary with side wing walls of the northern facade. Experts compare building with Cordoba cathedral mosque's west facade.

See also
 Islam in Azerbaijan
 List of mosques in Azerbaijan

References 

Mosques in Baku
Adolf Eichler buildings and structures